"Hallelujah" is a song written by Canadian singer Leonard Cohen, originally released on his album Various Positions (1984). Achieving little initial success, the song found greater popular acclaim through a new version recorded by John Cale in 1991. Cale's version inspired a 1994 recording by Jeff Buckley that in 2004 was ranked number 259 on Rolling Stone's "The 500 Greatest Songs of All Time".

The song achieved widespread popularity after Cale's version of it was featured in the 2001 film Shrek. Many other arrangements have been performed in recordings and in concert, with more than 300 versions known. The song has been used in film and television soundtracks and televised talent contests. "Hallelujah" experienced renewed interest following Cohen's death in November 2016 and re-appeared on international singles charts, including entering the American Billboard Hot 100 for the first time.

History

Cohen is reputed to have written around 80 to as many as 180 draft verses for "Hallelujah"—a number affected by the accounting question that he had many versions of the same line. Cohen is said to have claimed 150 draft verses, a claim substantiated by his notebooks containing manifold revisions and additions, and by contemporary interviews. In a writing session in New York's Royalton Hotel, Cohen is famously said to have been reduced to sitting on the floor in his underwear, filling notebooks, banging his head on the floor. Dan Geller and Dayna Goldfine, creators of the 2022 documentary film Hallelujah: Leonard Cohen, A Journey, A Song, said that Cohen took about five years to write the song, and reconfigured it numerous times for performances.

Unlike some other songs that became anthems, "Hallelujah" initially was on an album that was rejected by Columbia Records, was largely ignored after an independent label released it, wasn't widely covered until John Cale's 1991 version, and didn't reach the Billboard charts until Cohen's death in 2016. Reflecting on the song's initial rejection, Cohen related that Columbia told him that "we know you are great, but don't know if you are any good".

Following his original 1984 studio-album version, Cohen performed the original song on his world tour in 1985, but live performances during his 1988 and 1993 tours almost invariably contained a quite different set of lyrics. Numerous singers mix lyrics from both versions, and occasionally make direct lyric changes; for example, in place of Cohen's "holy dove", Canadian-American singer Rufus Wainwright substituted "holy dark", while Canadian singer-songwriter Allison Crowe sang "holy ghost".

Musical composition and lyrical interpretation
"Hallelujah", in its original version, is in  time, which evokes both early rock and roll and gospel music. Written in the key of C major, the chord progression of C, F, G, A minor, F matches those referenced in the song's famous first verse.

When at age 50 Cohen first recorded the song, he described it as "rather joyous", and said that it came from "a desire to affirm my faith in life, not in some formal religious way, but with enthusiasm, with emotion." He later said "there is a religious hallelujah, but there are many other ones. When one looks at the world, there’s only one thing to say, and it’s hallelujah". Journalist Larry Sloman, who knew Cohen well and interviewed him often, described the song as one part biblical, one part the woman that Cohen slept with last night, citing an unidentified critic saying that Cohen was most interested in "holiness and horniness".

His original version, recorded on his 1984 album Various Positions, contains allusions to several biblical verses, including the stories of Samson and Delilah from the Book of Judges ("she cut your hair") as well as King David and Bathsheba ("you saw her bathing on the roof, her beauty and the moonlight overthrew you").

Cohen's lyrical poetry and his view that "many different hallelujahs exist" is reflected in wide-ranging covers with very different intents or tones, allowing the song to be "melancholic, fragile, uplifting [or] joyous" depending on the performer: The Welsh singer-songwriter John Cale, the first person to record a cover version of the song (in 1991), promoted a message of "soberness and sincerity" in contrast to Cohen's dispassionate tone; the cover by Jeff Buckley, an American singer-songwriter, is more sorrowful and was described by Buckley as "a hallelujah to the orgasm"; Crowe interpreted the song as a "very sexual" composition that discussed relationships; Wainwright offered a "purifying and almost liturgical" interpretation; and Guy Garvey of the British band Elbow made the hallelujah a "stately creature" and incorporated his religious interpretation of the song into his band's recordings. Noting its inclusion in the 2001 animated movie Shrek and performance in numerous singing competition reality shows, New York Times movie reviewer A. O. Scott wrote that "Hallelujah is one of those rare songs that survives its banalization with at least some of its sublimity intact".

Canadian singer k.d. lang said in an interview shortly after Cohen's death that she considered the song to be about "the struggle between having human desire and searching for spiritual wisdom. It's being caught between those two places." Former Barenaked Ladies frontman Steven Page, who sang the song at Canadian politician Jack Layton's funeral, described the song as being "about disappointing [other] people".

The song was the subject of a 2012 book, The Holy or the Broken: Leonard Cohen, Jeff Buckley & the Unlikely Ascent of 'Hallelujah'; author Alan Light said that Cohen's "approach to language and craft feel unlike the work of anybody else. They sound rooted in poetry and literature because he studied as a poet and a novelist first." The book served as the basis for the 2022 documentary film Hallelujah: Leonard Cohen, A Journey, A Song; the film's co-creator said that Cohen "addressed the deepest of our human concerns about longing for connection and longing for some sort of hope, transcendence and acknowledgment of the difficulties of life."

Financial Times arts and culture columnist Enuma Okoro wrote that "the lyrics and the tone of the song seem to sway between hymn and dirge, two musical forms that could serve as responses to almost everything that happens in our lives: songs that celebrate and acknowledge the blessings and provisions of our lives, and songs that bemoan our losses, our heartbreaks, and our deaths". Okoro noted that the Hebrew language roots of the word hallelujah means "praise God", adding that Cohen said people have been "singing it for thousands of years to affirm our little journey".

Charts

Certifications

Cover versions

Since 1991, "Hallelujah" has been performed by more than 300 singers in many languages. Statistics from the Recording Industry Association of America (RIAA), the Canadian Recording Industry Association, the Australian Recording Industry Association, and the International Federation of the Phonographic Industry, show that, by late 2008, more than five million copies of the song sold in CD format. It has been the subject of a BBC Radio documentary, a book, and been in the soundtracks of numerous films and television programs. Different interpretations of the song may include different verses, out of the more than 80 verses Cohen originally wrote.

In an April 2009 CBC Radio interview, Cohen said he found the number of covers of his song "ironic and amusing", given that his record label refused to release it when he first wrote it; however, he then claimed the song could benefit from a break in exposure:

I was just reading a review of a movie called Watchmen that uses it and the reviewer said – "Can we please have a moratorium on 'Hallelujah' in movies and television shows?" And I kind of feel the same way ... I think it's a good song, but I think too many people sing it.

Conversely, in early 2012, while promoting his then-current album, Old Ideas, Cohen stated he was not tired of the song being covered:

There's been a couple of times when other people have said can we have a moratorium please on "Hallelujah"? Must we have it at the end of every single drama and every single Idol? And once or twice I've felt maybe I should lend my voice to silencing it but on second thought no, I'm very happy that it's being sung.

John Cale
John Cale's cover first appeared on I'm Your Fan (1991), a Leonard Cohen tribute album, and later on his live album Fragments of a Rainy Season (1992). Cale's version has vocals, piano, and different lyrics that Cohen had only performed live such as "I used to live alone before I knew you" and "All I ever learned from love was how to shoot at someone who outdrew you". Cale had watched Cohen perform the song and asked Cohen to send him the lyrics. Cohen then faxed Cale 15 pages of lyrics. Cale claims that he "went through and just picked out the cheeky verses."

Cale's version forms the basis of most subsequent performances, including Cohen's performances during his 2008–09 world tour. Cale's version is used in the film Shrek (2001), but Rufus Wainwright's version appears on the soundtrack album. Cale's also appears on the first soundtrack album for the TV series Scrubs and as the ending song of the Cold Case episode "Death Penalty, Final Appeal".

Jeff Buckley

Jeff Buckley, inspired by Cale's earlier cover, recorded one of the most acclaimed versions of "Hallelujah" for his only complete album, Grace, in 1994. It was released as a single in 2007, ten years after Buckley's death.

Critical reception
In 2004, Buckley's version was ranked number 259 on Rolling Stone's "The 500 Greatest Songs of All Time". The same year Time called Buckley's version "exquisitely sung," observing "Cohen murmured the original like a dirge, but ... Buckley treated the ... song like a tiny capsule of humanity, using his voice to careen between glory and sadness, beauty and pain ... It's one of the great songs."

In September 2007, a poll of fifty songwriters conducted by the magazine Q listed "Hallelujah" among the all-time "Top 10 Greatest Tracks" with John Legend calling Buckley's version "as near perfect as you can get. The lyrics to 'Hallelujah' are just incredible and the melody's gorgeous and then there's Jeff's interpretation of it. It's one of the most beautiful pieces of recorded music I've ever heard." In July 2009, the Buckley track was ranked number three on the 2009 Triple J Hottest 100 of All Time, a listener poll held every decade by the Australian radio station Triple J. In 2017, The International Observer named Buckley's version of "Hallelujah" the greatest song of all time.

On 2 April 2013, it was announced that Buckley's version of the song will be inducted into the Library of Congress's National Recording Registry.

Commercial performance
Buckley's version was not an instant hit, nor did Buckley live to see the full measure of the reception his recording would ultimately have; he died in 1997. The album on which it appeared did not go gold in the U.S. until 2002, nine years after its release. In fact, like Cohen's original, the Buckley version was not released as a single until much later, and it did not chart until 2006, posthumously for Buckley. In March of that year, Buckley had his first national top 10 best-seller when "Hallelujah" was at number seven in Norway. In 2007, it made the top 3 on the Swedish charts. In March 2008, it topped Billboard's Hot Digital Songs in the U.S. after a performance of the song by Jason Castro in the seventh season of American Idol. The sudden resurgence of interest provided both Gold and Platinum status, the RIAA certifying the digital track on 22 April 2008. It has sold 1,144,000 digital copies in the US as of May 2010. It also hit number one in France in March 2008.

Usage in media
The Buckley version has been widely used in film and television dramas, including the movie Lord of War, the series The West Wing, Crossing Jordan, Without a Trace, The O.C., Third Watch, LAX, and Justiça. "Hallelujah can be joyous or bittersweet, depending on what part of it you use", Time quoted Buckley's publisher as saying. The magazine opined that its liberal use in some cases was "a tacit admission that neither the writers nor the actors could convey their characters' emotions as well as Buckley."

On 20 April 2013, Buckley's version of the song was played at Fenway Park during a tribute honoring the victims of the Boston Marathon bombing before the Red Sox played their first home game following the tragedy.

Charts

Weekly charts

Year-end charts

Certifications

Rufus Wainwright

Canadian-American musician and singer Rufus Wainwright had briefly met Jeff Buckley and recorded a tribute to him after his 1997 death. That song, "Memphis Skyline", referenced Buckley's version of "Hallelujah", which Wainwright would later record, though using piano and a similar arrangement to Cale's. Wainwright's version is included on the album Shrek: Music from the Original Motion Picture, although it was Cale's version that was used in the film itself. The Shrek soundtrack, containing Wainwright's cover, was certified 2× Platinum in the United States in 2003 as selling more than two million copies.

Rufus Wainwright, his sister Martha Wainwright, and Joan Wasser performed the song in the film Leonard Cohen: I'm Your Man.

In 2016, Rufus Wainwright recorded a version of the song with a chorus of 1500 singers at a disused power station in Toronto.

Charts

k.d. lang 

In 2004, k.d. lang recorded a version of "Hallelujah" on her album Hymns of the 49th Parallel. She has since sung it at several major events, such as at the Canadian Juno Awards of 2005, where it "brought the audience to its feet for a two-minute ovation." Lang also sang it at the 2006 Canadian Songwriters Hall of Fame when Cohen was inducted into the Hall of Fame. Cohen's partner, singer Anjani Thomas, said: "After hearing k.d. lang perform that song at the Canadian Songwriter's Hall of Fame in 2006 we looked at each other and said, 'well, I think we can lay that song to rest now! It's really been done to its ultimate blissful state of perfection'." Lang sang it at the opening ceremony of the 2010 Winter Olympic Games in Vancouver, before a claimed TV audience of three billion.

Lang again performed the song at the 2017 Tower of Song: A Memorial Tribute to Leonard Cohen concert.

Charts

Certifications

Alexandra Burke

Alexandra Burke, the winner of the fifth series of the reality television show The X Factor, released a condensed cover version of the song as a prize for her victory. It reached Christmas number one on the UK Singles Chart on 21 December 2008.

Chart battle with other versions
The release of Burke's cover created interest in the previous versions of the song, including a Buckley fan campaign to take Buckley's cover to the top of the Christmas chart and therefore deny Burke the top spot. The campaign was fuelled by Buckley fans' dislike of The X Factors commercialism and the song's arrangement, as well as their desire to introduce younger people to Buckley's version. Burke herself was not enamoured of the choice of song, remarking: "It just didn't do anything for me."

Commercial performance
Burke's version broke a European sales record after selling more than 105,000 digital downloads in just one day, breaking the previous record set by Leona Lewis. The song sold 576,000 copies in its first week, becoming the fastest-selling single released by a woman in the United Kingdom and the 2008 Christmas number one, while Buckley's cover charted at number two and Cohen's original version at number 36.

On 28 December 2008, the UK Singles Chart listed Burke's version as the biggest-selling single of the year, with NME announcing sales of more than one million copies since its release. This also made Burke the first ever female British artist to have a million-selling single in the UK. It has sold 1.330 million as of August 2016, making it the biggest-selling X Factor winner's single to date.

Charts

Certifications

Pentatonix

The a cappella group Pentatonix covered the song in the quintet's 2016 album, A Pentatonix Christmas. On 21 October 2016, Pentatonix also released a music video for their cover filmed in the California Mojave Desert.

Weekly charts

Year-end charts

Certifications

Other cover versions

Bob Dylan was among the first to perform Cohen's song in concert with his earliest noted performance being in Montreal on 8 July 1988. Other notable singers who have covered "Hallelujah" include Brandi Carlile, Regina Spektor, Willie Nelson, Susan Boyle, Tim Minchin, Myles Kennedy, and Bono. Bono's version, which is mostly spoken, was included in Tower of Song, an all-star tribute to Cohen in 1995. Bon Jovi has covered the song several times in concert, including on their 2008 Live at Madison Square Garden DVD.

In 2006, the Norwegian quartet of Espen Lind, Kurt Nilsen, Alejandro Fuentes and Askil Holm released a cover of the song. After debuting at number 8 on the Norwegian VG-lista, the single reached number one in January 2007. The song remained listed on the Norwegian top 20 for 37 (non-consecutive) weeks between 2006 and 2007. The song also appears on the 2006 album Hallelujah Live, credited to Lind with Nilsen, Fuentes and Holm, which also reached the top of the Norwegian VG-lista.

International group Il Divo released a Spanish-language adaptation with different lyrics on their album The Promise (2008), which topped the charts in the UK. The song was performed by recording artist Damien Rice at the 2008 Rock and Roll Hall of Fame inductions when Cohen was inducted. That same year Welsh mezzo-soprano Katherine Jenkins recorded a classical-crossover version for her album Sacred Arias. Kate Voegele performed it in character as Mia Catalano in the U.S. teen drama One Tree Hill. Also appearing on an album, her version made the Hot 100 Billboard charts and reached number 53 in the UK shortly after airing of the episode there. Also in 2008, the Welsh band Brigyn released a version in Welsh. In 2009 Swedish artist Ebba Forsberg released a version sung in Swedish.

The song has become a staple of television talent shows. Jason Castro, an American Idol season 7 contestant, performed a version on 4 March 2008, which propelled Jeff Buckley's version of the song to the top of the Billboard digital song chart. His version was included in his self-titled debut album and his second studio album, Who I Am. Lisa Hordijk, winner of the 2009 Dutch X Factor, released "Hallelujah" as her debut single, which went double platinum and remained at the top of the Dutch charts for ten weeks.

A 2009 hit by Orthodox Jewish singer Ohad Moskowitz, "Bo'i Kala", featuring the words of the traditional tune accompanying a Jewish bride to the chuppah, is a musical adaptation of "Hallelujah".

On 22 January 2010, American musicians Justin Timberlake, Matt Morris, and Charlie Sexton performed a live cover version of "Hallelujah" during the Hope for Haiti Now telethon in support of those affected by the 2010 Haiti earthquake. A recorded version was released the following day on the Hope for Haiti Now soundtrack album and reached a peak of number 13 on the Billboard Hot 100 chart.

On 16 April 2010, the Edmonton Symphony Orchestra and the Richard Eaton Singers conducted by Jack Everly premiered a new arrangement for orchestra and chorus by Claude Lapalme. Also in 2010, the Maccabeats of Yeshiva University released Voices from the Heights, with an a cappella version of "Hallelujah" set to the Hebrew words of the Shabbat liturgical poem "Lecha Dodi".

Steven Page performed the song live at the state funeral of Canadian Opposition Leader Jack Layton on 27 August 2011.

Raul Esparza performed the song live at the Kennedy Center's 11 September Memorial Concert on 8 September 2011.

In May 2012, Canada's Royal Winnipeg Ballet presented the World Premiere of The Doorway – Scenes from Leonard Cohen, created and choreographed by Jorden Morris – with "Hallelujah" performed by Allison Crowe (voice and piano) and ballerinas Sophia Lee and Jo-Ann Gudilin dancing alternate dates.

On the 17 December 2012 episode of The Voice, the song was covered in tribute to the victims of the Sandy Hook Elementary School shooting by coaches Christina Aguilera, Adam Levine, Blake Shelton and Cee Lo Green.

American actor, comedian and musician Adam Sandler performed an off-color parody of "Hallelujah" in December 2012 at Madison Square Garden in New York City as part of 12-12-12: The Concert for Sandy Relief, with Paul Shaffer on piano. Sandler's version contained numerous references to Hurricane Sandy and contemporary events in local culture, sports and politics.

Singer Tori Kelly recorded a cover of "Hallelujah" for the animated film Sing and has done two notable live performances of the song: during the "In Memoriam" portion of the 68th Primetime Emmy Awards, and alongside Luis Fonsi during the 2017 Hand in Hand: A Benefit for Hurricane Relief telethon. In August 2020, Cohen fans were incensed when Kelly's recording was played after Donald Trump's speech at the Republican National Convention. A legal representative for the Cohen estate said they had "specifically declined the RNC's use request" for "one of the most important songs in the Cohen song catalogue". She added that the estate might have approved the use of Cohen's "You Want It Darker".

On 12 November 2016, an episode of Saturday Night Live opened with cast member Kate McKinnon as Hillary Clinton performing a rendition of the song in tribute to both Cohen and Clinton. The preceding week had seen both Cohen's death and Clinton's loss to Donald Trump in the 2016 U.S. presidential election.

Linkin Park frontman Chester Bennington sang "Hallelujah" during his eulogy to Chris Cornell at Hollywood Forever Cemetery on 26 May 2017.

The American alt-right conspiracy theorist and comedian Owen Benjamin used the music of "Hallelujah" with new lyrics in his song titled "How They Rule Ya" in support of freeing British far right activist Tommy Robinson, who was held at the time for contempt of court charges for violating a press gag order and illegally filming some of the defendants in the trial of the Huddersfield grooming gang. Released on 12 June 2018 under the alternative title "Free Tommy Robinson", it charted in the UK iTunes Charts. Robinson as a tribute and gratitude to Owen Benjamin, upon his release led the crowd outside the Old Bailey to a rendition of the song written by Benjamin.

At a national remembrance in January 2021 for those killed by the COVID-19 pandemic in the United States, Yolanda Adams sang a slightly modified two verses of "Hallelujah", changing "Maybe there's no God above" to "I know that there's a God above". A number of American Jews criticized the performance, as they had a usage of the song at the end of the 2020 Republican National Convention, for ignoring the song's lyrics about sexuality and questioning one's faith.

Inclusions in film, television and events
 
 American Idol
 America's Got Talent
 Basquiat
 Cold Case
 Criminal Minds
 Crossing Jordan
 CSI
 COVID memorial service (Washington, 2021)
 Dancing with the Stars
 Elizabeth II's 2022 memorial ceremony in Ottawa
 ER
 General Hospital
 Hope for Haiti Now concert
 House
 I Can Only Imagine
 Zack Snyder's Justice League
 LAX
 Longmire
 Lord of War
 Numbers
 The O.C.
 Olympics opening ceremony (Vancouver)
 One Tree Hill
 Saint Ralph
 Saturday Night Live
 Scrubs
 Sense8
 Shrek
 Sing
 The Sing-Off So You Think You Can Dance Third Watch Trauma True Blood
 Watchmen
 The West Wing
 Without a Trace
 The X Factor
 The Young Pope
 12-12-12: The Concert for Sandy ReliefAccolades and achievements
 The BBC commemorated the 25th anniversary of the first recording of "Hallelujah" with an hour-long radio documentary, The Fourth, The Fifth, The Minor Fall, broadcast on 1 November 2008, in which the song's history and numerous cover versions were presented and discussed.
 The song was named one of the top ten greatest tracks of all time in a poll of songwriters conducted by the British music magazine Q.
 Rolling Stone magazine listed the song as one of the 500 greatest songs.
 In the February 2009 issue of Blender, "Hallelujah" was named that month's "Greatest Song Ever" (a monthly feature).
 In 2005, "Hallelujah" was named the tenth-greatest Canadian song of all time in Chart magazine's annual readers' poll.
 On 21 December 2008, "Hallelujah" became the first song in 51 years to hold the top two positions on the UK Singles Chart; The X Factor winner Alexandra Burke's and American singer Jeff Buckley's covers were the two highest-selling songs in the week beginning 15 December 2008. Leonard Cohen's version was number 36 in the same chart.
 In 2014, "Hallelujah" was ranked number 1 in Rolling Stones "Best Leonard Cohen Songs" readers' poll.
 Cohen's original version was ranked number 74 on the 2021 edition of "Top 500 Songs of All Time" by Rolling Stone magazine.

Other charted versionsNotes A'''  Bastian Baker's version of "Hallelujah" did not enter the Ultratop 50, but peaked at number 5 on the Wallonia Ultratip chart.

References

Further reading

External links
 1984 version lyrics, on The Leonard Cohen Files
 1988 version lyrics, on The Leonard Cohen Files
 BBC: Just whose hallelujah is it anyway? – article on writing and meaning of song
  The Birth of kd lang's "Hallelujah" out of the 'Spirit of Music' Perfect Sound Forever online music magazine presents... 2011 article, by philosopher Babette Babich
  BBC: Hallelujah! The rise and rise of Leonard Cohen's once-forgotten classic – 2012 report, by writer Alan Light
 Hallelujah Guitar chords on Chordlines

1984 songs
1984 singles
1980s ballads
2003 singles
2007 singles
2008 debut singles
2016 singles
Alexandra Burke songs
Black-and-white music videos
Bon Jovi songs
Christmas number-one singles in the United Kingdom
Columbia Records singles
Contemporary R&B ballads
Cultural depictions of Bathsheba
Cultural depictions of David
Cultural depictions of Samson
Dutch Top 40 number-one singles
Irish Singles Chart number-one singles
Jeff Buckley songs
Leonard Cohen songs
Number-one singles in Norway
Number-one singles in Scotland
Pentatonix songs
RCA Records singles
Rock ballads
Rufus Wainwright songs
SNEP Top Singles number-one singles
Songs about music
Songs based on the Bible
Songs written by Leonard Cohen
Syco Music singles
The X Factor (British TV series)
UK Singles Chart number-one singles
Ultratop 50 Singles (Flanders) number-one singles
United States National Recording Registry recordings
Universal Records singles